Ornipholidotos kennedyi is a butterfly in the family Lycaenidae. It is found in Cameroon. Its habitat consists of forests.

References

Butterflies described in 2005
Taxa named by Michel Libert
Ornipholidotos
Endemic fauna of Cameroon
Butterflies of Africa